Pterin-4-alpha-carbinolamine dehydratase is an enzyme that in humans is encoded by the PCBD1 gene.

Function 

This gene encodes pterin-4 alpha-carbinolamine dehydratase, an enzyme involved in phenylalanine hydroxylation. The enzyme regulates the homodimerization of the transcription factor hepatocyte nuclear factor 1 (HNF1).

Clinical significance
Mutations of the PCBD1 gene cause pterin-4 alpha-carbinolamine dehydratase deficiency, one of the forms of tetrahydrobiopterin deficiency.

Interactions 

PCBD1 has been shown to interact with DYRK1B and HNF1A.

References

Further reading